The Saunders A.4 Medina was a British flying boat built by S.E. Saunders at East Cowes, Isle of Wight.

Development
The Medina was built for the Air Council between 1925 and 1926 and was a plywood-covered wooden flying boat powered by two 450 hp Bristol Jupiter VI radial engines mounted onto and slung from the top wings.  The upper wing was slightly smaller than the lower wing, braced with Warren truss-type interplane struts. It had a crew of two and room for ten passengers. Only one Medina was built, registered G-EBMG, first flying in November 1926. It proved disappointing, having poor water handling, with its hull being prone to leaks. It was withdrawn from use and scrapped in 1929.

Specifications

See also

Notes

References

External links

The Saunders Medina

1920s British civil utility aircraft
Flying boats
Medina
Biplanes
Aircraft first flown in 1926
Twin piston-engined tractor aircraft